Impressions of Mary Lou is an album by pianist John Hicks which was recorded in 1998 and released on the HighNote label. The album features eight compositions by Mary Lou Williams along with five by Hicks.

Reception
AllMusic reviewed the album stating "What is so compelling about Hicks' salute to Williams is that he ignores her best known secular works; he sticks mostly to excerpts from her religious compositions, which, of course, still swing mightily... Recommended". JazzTimes said "Hicks does a good job getting inside the tunes and developing them in his own way... Admirers of Hicks and Williams should enjoy this well-executed homage".

Track listing 
All compositions by Mary Lou Williams except as indicated
 "Lord Have Mercy" - 4:31
 "Ballad for Mary Lou" (John Hicks) - 3:21
 "O.W." - 4:08
 "Old Time Spiritual" - 3:45
 "Mary Lou's Interlude" (Hicks) - 4:09
 "Medi II" - 7:54
 "Not Just Your Blues" (Hicks) - 4:31
 "Intermission" (Williams, Milton Suggs) - 4:58
 "Not Too Straight" (Hicks) - 4:03
 "Two for You" (Hicks) - 4:31
 "Aries" - 2:15
 "The Lord Says" - 3:55

Personnel 
John Hicks - piano
Dwayne Dolphin - bass
Cecil Brooks III - drums

Production
Cecil Brooks III - producer
George Heid - engineer

References 

John Hicks (jazz pianist) albums
2000 albums
HighNote Records albums